Static is the second full-length album by the Christian rock band Bleach.  It was released in 1998 under Forefront Records. The album peaked at 22 for 4 weeks on the Billboard Top Christian Albums chart during the summer of 1998, and is the only Bleach album to chart.

Track listing
"Static" - 3:17
"Super Good Feeling" - 3:18
"Rundown Town" - 4:53
"Land Of The Lost" - 3:16
"Hurricane" - 2:19
"Warp Factor Five" - 3:51
"Rock N Roll" - 3:47
"Code Of The Road" - 3:42
"Lonestar" - 3:59
"Drive" - 2:48
"Country Western Star" - 3:17
"Waving Goodbye" - 3:39

References

1998 albums
Bleach (American band) albums
ForeFront Records albums